The Glenmore Velodrome is a 400-metre outdoor bicycle racing track in Calgary, Alberta. It is operated by the Calgary Bicycle Track League, and was built in 1974. The track surface is concrete, with 29 degree banking in the corners. It hosted the 1975 National Track Championships.

References

Velodromes in Canada
Sports venues in Calgary